Karl Kezy Fabien (born 1 August 2000) is a professional footballer who plays as a midfielder for Vierzon. Born in mainland France, he plays for the Martinique national team.

Career
Fabien made his professional debut with AS Nancy in a 2–1 Ligue 2 loss to FC Lorient on 24 January 2020.

On 11 July 2022, Fabien signed with Vierzon in the fourth-tier Championnat National 2.

Personal life
Born in mainland France, Fabien is of Martiniquais descent. He was called up to represent the Martinique national team for a pair of friendlies in March 2022. He debuted with Martinique in a friendly 4–3 win over Guadeloupe on 26 March 2022.

References

External links
 
 LFP Profile

2000 births
Living people
French people of Martiniquais descent
Martiniquais footballers
French footballers
Association football midfielders
Martinique international footballers
Ligue 2 players
Championnat National players
Championnat National 3 players
AS Nancy Lorraine players
US Orléans players
Vierzon FC players